Thomas Francis Kerrigan (October 10, 1895 – May 6, 1964) was an American professional golfer who played in the early 20th century. Kerrigan's best performance in the Open Championship came in the 1921 Open Championship when after enduring an Atlantic voyage aboard the RMS Aquitania he quickly acclimated himself to the Open Championship course at St Andrews on arrival in Britain and finished in third place. He was a frequent competitor in the PGA Championship in which his best results were quarter-final losses (in match play) in 1916, 1922, and 1925.

Early life
Kerrigan was born in Quincy, Massachusetts, on October 10, 1895 to Thomas F. Kerrigan (1873–1926) and Mary E. Kerrigan née Carroll (1869–1914). Like nearly all professionals from his era, he first learned the game of golf as a caddie in his youth. He joined the Siwanoy Country Club in 1914 and served as professional for a year at the Dedham Country and Polo Club in Massachusetts; however, he later returned to Siwanoy and would spend the majority of his career there. In 1939 he shot the exceptionally low score of 62 on the par-71 Siwanoy course. He was often called "Tee Shot" Kerrigan due to his ability to hit unusually long drives.

Golf career

Westchester Open
Kerrigan, who by 1920 was playing out of Siwanoy Country Club, carded two rounds totaling 143 and won by six shots in the inaugural 1920 Westchester Open golf tournament held on the Gedney Farm Country Club course (now known as Westchester Hills Golf Club). His driving was described as "long and straight". His iron shots were effectively executed and he was able to handle the treacherous greens when the other players could not. His putting was said to be "wellnigh faultless". Arthur Reid, playing out of Ardsley Country Club, was second on 149 and Jack Dowling came in third on 150.

Canadian Open
Kerrigan was twice the runner-up in the Canadian Open championship. In the 1922 Canadian Open, held at Mt. Bruno Golf Club in Saint-Bruno, Quebec, Kerrigan shot 304 and Al Watrous was on 303, beating Kerrigan by a single shot. Kerrigan returned to play in the 1923 Canadian Open, held on the Herbert Strong-designed Lakeview Golf Club in Toronto, Ontario, and once again finished in the second spot, this time losing to Clarence Hackney by the score of 295 to 300.

1921 Open Championship
The 1921 Open Championship was the 56th Open Championship, held 23–25 June at the Old Course at St Andrews in St Andrews, Scotland. Former local Jock Hutchison won his only Open Championship, in a 36-hole playoff over amateur Roger Wethered. It was Hutchison's second and final major title. Kerrigan finished in third place, carding rounds of 74-80-72-72=298, and won £40.

Golf teacher
Kerrigan taught many golfers who went on to success in their own right in golf. Among them was Jess Sweetser, the first American-born amateur golfer to win the British Amateur championship which in 1926 was contested at Muirfield. Sweetser also won the 1922 U.S. Amateur championship.

Military service
Kerrigan served in the U.S. Navy during World War I. He played in charity matches, sometimes wearing his Navy uniform, to raise money for the American Red Cross.

Death
After a three-month-long illness, Kerrigan died on May 6, 1964 at Lawrence Hospital (now New York-Presbyterian Lawrence Hospital) in Bronxville, New York. His brothers William and George were golf professionals as well.

PGA Tour wins (4)
1920 Westchester Open
1921 one win
1922 two wins

Source:

Results in major championships

NYF = Tournament not yet founded
NT = No tournament
DNP = Did not play

R64, R32, R16, QF, SF = Round in which player lost in PGA Championship match play
"T" indicates a tie for a place
Yellow background for top-10

References

American male golfers
PGA Tour golfers
Golfers from Massachusetts
Sportspeople from Quincy, Massachusetts
1895 births
1964 deaths